Bake is a surname. Notable people with the surname include:

Dek Bake (born 1984), American football player
Franz Bäke (1898–1978), German Army officer and Panzer commander
Jan Bake (1787–1864), Dutch philologist and critic
Laurens Bake (1629–1702), Dutch poet

See also
Martin Bakes (born 1937), English former footballer
Baake, another surname